The 1986 Atlantic Coast Conference men's basketball tournament took place in Greensboro, North Carolina, at the Greensboro Coliseum from March 7–9. Duke won the championship, defeating Georgia Tech, 68–67. Johnny Dawkins of Duke was named the tournament MVP.

Bracket

References

Tournament
ACC men's basketball tournament
College sports tournaments in North Carolina
Basketball competitions in Greensboro, North Carolina
ACC men's basketball tournament
ACC men's basketball tournament